The Street Singer (aka, Interval for Romance) is a 1937 British musical film directed by Jean de Marguenat and starring Arthur Tracy, Margaret Lockwood and Arthur Riscoe. The screenplay concerns a famous musician who is mistaken for a street singer. It was an early role for Margaret Lockwood. The film's sets were designed by the art director Erwin Scharf.

Cast
 Arthur Tracy as Richard King 
 Arthur Riscoe as Sam Green 
 Margaret Lockwood as Jenny Green 
 Hugh Wakefield as Hugh Newman 
 Emile Boreo as Luigi 
 Ellen Pollock as Gloria Weston 
 Wally Patch as Policeman 
 Ian McLean as Police Inspector 
 John Deverell as James 
 Rawicz and Landauer as Specialty Act 
 Lew Stone and His Band

References

External links

The Street Singer at TCMDB
The Street Singer at Britmovie
Review of film at Variety

1937 films
British musical films
British black-and-white films
1937 musical films
1930s English-language films
1930s British films